Chitram Seenu is an Indian actor who primarily appears in Telugu films. Seenu is known for his role in the film Chitram. He has acted in over 260 Telugu films. He will turn hero for the films Viswadhabhi Rama and Mayasabha.

Filmography

Chitram (2000) as Ramana's friend
Anandam (2001) as Chandu
Aadi (2002)
Nuvvu Leka Nenu Lenu (2002) as Guava seller
Hai (2002)
Neetho as Madhav's friend
Sontham (2002) as Shesham's friend
Okato Number Kurraadu (2002)
Yuva Rathna
Nee Sneham (2002) as  Madhav's friend
Ammayilu Abbayilu (2003)
Uthsaham
Sambhu
Vishnu (2003) 
Tarak
Malliswari (2004) as Peon Seenu
Venky (2004) as Ramana
Ammayi Bagundi (2004)
Gowri (2004) 
Sakhiya (2004) 
Oray Pandu (2005)
Prayatnam 
Bunny (2005) as Bunny's friend
Narasimhudu (2005)
Guru (2005)
Modati Cinema (2005)
Premante Inthe 
Bommarillu (2006) as Kedimangina Sreenu
Seetharamudu 
Nee Navve Chalu 
Jagadam (2007) as  Vaali
Dhee (2007)
Dubai Seenu  (2007) as  Ramana
Sathyabhama 
Mantra (2007) 
Bangaru Konda 
Godava (2007) 
Pelli Kani Prasad
Bhale Dongalu (2008) as bouquet seller
Gita 
Naa Manasukemaindi 
Parugu (2008) as Shrinu
Ekaloveyudu (2008)
Dongala Bandi (2008)
Pistha (2009)
Vaade Kavali
Taj Mahal (2010)
Thakita Thakita (2010)
Komaram Puli (2010) as  Constable
100% Love (2011)
Mayagadu
Nuvvekkadunte Nenakkadunta
Mythri
Sarocharu (2012)
Em Babu Laddu Kavala 
Chukkalanti Ammayi Chakkanaina Abbayi (2013)
Manam(2014) as Constable Sreenu
Drushyam as Bus Owner Murali (2014)
Aagadu (2014)
Raja the Great (2017) as  Lucky's Uncle
Nela Ticket (2018)
Jamba Lakidi Pamba
Geetha Govindam (2018) as Taxi driver
Taxiwaala (2018)
 Bhagyanagara Veedullo Gamattu (2019)
 10th Class Diaries (2022)

Television 
 9 Hours (2022; Disney+ Hotstar)

References

External links
 

Living people
Telugu male actors
Telugu comedians
Indian male film actors
Year of birth missing (living people)
Indian male actors
21st-century Indian male actors
Indian male comedians
Male actors in Telugu cinema